The A Low Down Dirty Shame Soundtrack is the official soundtrack to the 1994 film A Low Down Dirty Shame. The album was released in 1994 on Jive Records and Hollywood Records.

The soundtrack peaked at 70 on the Billboard 200 chart. By March 1995, it was certified gold in sales by the RIAA, after sales exceeding 500,000 copies in the United States.

Release and reception 
The album peaked at number seventy on the U.S. Billboard 200 and reached the fourteenth spot on the R&B albums chart. Stephen Thomas Erlewine of Allmusic, while noting that the entire album was well-produced, stated that "there is a noticeable lack of memorable material, leaving the record as nothing but a pleasant genre exercise." Critic David Browne in an Entertainment Weekly article graded it a "B−", calling most of the soundtrack "more workmanlike than inspired," like the song "Later On" by Casual. However, Browne praised the Zhané remake of the 1970s disco song "Shame" (originally sung by Evelyn "Champagne" King) and R. Kelly's contributions to the album as the soundtrack's positives.

Track listing

Chart history

Album

Singles 

"—" denotes releases that did not chart.

Certifications

Personnel 
Information taken from Allmusic.
 arranging – Jimmy Jam, Terry Lewis
 assistant – Chris Agamanolis, Martin Czembor, Brandon Harris, Steve Hodge, Joshua Shapera, Steve Souder, Jeff Taylor
 assistant engineering – Chris Agamanolis, Lane Craven, Martin Czembor, Brandon Harris, Vaughn Merrick, Joshua Shapera, Steve Souder, Jeff Taylor, Steve Warner
 bass – Terry Lewis
 chanting – McKinley Horton, Jellybean Johnson, Raja Nee, Jeff Taylor
 composing – John Fitch
 drum programming – Lance Alexander, Jeff Taylor
 drums – Mike Chapman
 engineering – Mike Chapman, Bob Fudjinski, Eric Gast, Stephen George, Steve Hodge, Matt Kelley, Adam Kudzin, Lee Mars, Peter Mokran, Mark Paladino, Keith Senior, Jason Shablik, Martin Stebbing, Jeff Taylor, Chris Trevett
 executive production – Barry Hankerson
 guitar – Robert Cunningham, Keith Henderson, Peter Mokran, Joshua Shapera
 horn – Bill Ortiz
 keyboards – Lafayette Carthon Jr., Mike Chapman, Cold 187 um, B-Laid Back Edwards, Jimmy Jam, Trent Thomas
 mastering – Tom Coyne
 mixing – Ron Allaire, Chip Fu, Bob Fudjinski, Steve Hodge, R. Kelly, Tony Maserati, Peter Mokran, Organized Konfusion, David Rideau, Chris Trevett
 mixing engineer – Bob Fudjinski, Chris Trevett
 percussion – Terry Lewis
 performer(s) – Aaliyah, Tevin Campbell, Casual, Changing Faces, Extra Prolific, Hi-Five, R. Kelly, Mz. Kilo, Keith Murray, Nuttin' Nyce, Q-Tip, Raja Nee, Silk, Smooth, Souls of Mischief, Zhané
 piano – Lafayette Carthon Jr., Trent Thomas
 production – A+, Mike Chapman, Cold 187 um, K. Fingers, Fu-Schnickens, Jimmy Jam, R. Kelly, Terry Lewis, Lyvio G., Organized Konfusion, Pimp C, Erick Sermon, Trent Thomas, Touré
 programming – Lance Alexander, Peter Mokran, Martin Stebbing, Jeff Taylor
 project coordination – Pamela Hughes, Stephanie Tudor
 rapping – R. Kelly
 remixing – R. Kelly
 scratching – Touré
 vocals – Tevin Campbell, Changing Faces, Jellybean Johnson, Terry Lewis, Ocee, Q-Tip, Raja Nee, Jeff Taylor
 vocals (background) – Robert "The Professor" Anderson, Cold 187 um, Stephanie Edwards, Steve Gray, Stephanie Huff, Raja Nee, Geraldine Sigler, Daniel Stokes
 vocoder programming – Lance Alexander

Notes

External links 
 
 A Low Down Dirty Shame at Discogs

Action film soundtracks
Hip hop soundtracks
1995 soundtrack albums
Jive Records soundtracks
Rhythm and blues soundtracks
Comedy film soundtracks